Sudu Andagena Kalu Awidin also known as Sudu Adagena Kalu Awidin  is a Sri Lankan television series starring Dulan Manjula Liyanage, Chandani Seneviratne, Michelle Dilhara , Lakshman Mendis, Umayangana Wickramasinghe broadcast on Sri Lanka Rupavahini Corporation released in 2019, directed by Sunil Costa. In 2019, the teledrama  won the Most Popular Teledrama of the year Award at the 24th Sumathi Awards ceremony.

In 2020 Sudu Andagena Kalu Awidin received 14 nominations including Best Drama, Best Director, Best Actor, Best Actress, Best Up-Coming Actor, Best Up-Coming Actress, Best Music score, Best Cameraman at the Raigam Tele'es award ceremony.

Plot 

The teledrama portrays the story of Ayoma Michelle Dilhara coming from Madawachchiya with her mother Suba Umayangana Wickramasinghe to find her father. They travel in a bus and was dropped off in a rural village. Ayoma questions her mother Suba asking where is her aunt. But Suba pretends that she didn't say about the aunt. After asking so many questions Suba gets angry at Ayoma and accepts that she lied. Ayoma gets annoyed with Suba and she stubbornly leaves her and starts walking along the road alone. Ayoma feels scared after some time but she stays strong. She also feels as if she was being followed. Meanwhile, Suba meets Amarapala, Lakshman Mendis. He asks Suba where she is heading. She refuses to tell the truth. Amarapala invites Suba and Ayoma to his house in case if there is a problem. Later Amarapala returns home. He tells Swarna Chandani Seneviratne, about the newcomers to the village. But Swarna doesn't show any interest in it.

Cast and characters 
 Lakshman Mendis as Amarapala
 Chandani Seneviratne as Suwarna
 Michelle Dilhara as Ayoma
 Ananda Kumara Unnahe as Wilson
 Dulan Manjula Liyanage as Wimalasiri (Pancha)
 Umayangana Wickramasinghe as Suba
 Niroshan Wijesinghe as Rupasinghe 
 Veena Jayakody
 Madushani Warnakulasuriya as Surangi
 Shalitha Gunawardena as Ranga
Hasarinda Keshara Liyanaarachchi as Sirinatha

Awards

Sumathi Awards

|-
|| 2019 ||| Sunil Costa || Most Popular Teledrama || 
|-

Raigam Tele'es 2019

|-
|| 2020 ||| Dhanushka Karunathilaka, Manjula Kakulawala, Naduni Rosmarika|| Best Teledrama of the year || 
|-
|| 2020 ||| Ananda Kumara Unnehe || Best Teledrama Actor || 
|-
|| 2020 ||| Michelle Dilhara || Best Upcoming Actress || 
|-
|| 2020 ||| Ajantha Alahakoon || Best Art Director || 
|-
|| 2020 ||| Sisikirana Pranavitharana|| Best Cinematography || 
|-
|| 2020 ||| Dinesh Subasinghe || Best Music Director || 
|-
|| 2020 ||Shan de Alwis|| Best Editor || 
|-
|| 2020 ||| Umayangana Wickramasinghe|| Best Actress || 
|-
|| 2020 |||Dulan Manjula Liyanage|| Best Upcoming Actor || 
|-
|| 2020 |||Shalitha Gunawardena|| Best Makeup Artist || 
|-
|| 2020 ||Chamara Madushanka|| Best Sound Recording || 
|-
|| 2020 ||Madushani Warnakulasuriya|| Best Upcoming Actress || 
|-
|| 2020 ||Sunil Costa|| Best Script || 
|-
|| 2020 ||Sunil Costa|| Best Teledrama Director || 
|-

References

External links

Sri Lankan drama television series
2000s Sri Lankan television series
2007 Sri Lankan television series debuts
Sri Lankan 3D films
Sri Lanka Rupavahini Corporation original programming